is a Japanese actress.

Filmography

Films
 Monooki no Piano (2014) as Haruka Miyamoto
 When the Curtain Rises (2015) as Aoi Hakamada
 Sunflower on the Hill (2015) as Takako's friend during his high school days
 Senpai to Kanojo (2015) as Rika Tsuzuki
 64: Part I (2016) as Ayumi Mikami
 64: Part II (2016) as Ayumi Mikami
 The Anthem of the Heart (2017) as Jun Naruse
 Samurai's Promise (2018) - as Misuzu Shinohara
 Kasane: Beauty and Fate (2018) as Kasane and Nina Tanzawa
 Bento Harassment (2019) as Futaba Mochimaru
 Iwane: Sword of Serenity (2019) as  Nao Kobayashi
 Seven Days War (2019) as Aya Chiyono (voice)
 The Memory Eraser (2020) as Maki
 First Love (2021) as Kanna Hijiriyama
 The Supporting Actors: The Movie (2021) as herself
 Arc (2021)
 The Pass: Last Days of the Samurai (2022) as Mutsu

Television dramas
 Last Cinderella (2013, Fuji TV, episode 1-4 and 6-11) as Saki Takenouchi
 Kamen Teacher (2013, NTV) as Nanami Komatsu
 Hakuba no Ouji-sama Junai Tekireiki (2013, YTV) as Ryoko Kita
 Hanako to Anne (2014, NHK, episode 127-) as Fujiko Miyamoto
 Detective versus Detectives (2015, Fuji TV) as Sakura Sasaki
 High School Chorus (2015, TBS) as Makoto Kagawa
 Itsuka Kono Koi o Omoidashite Kitto Naite Shimau (2016, Fuji TV, episode 9-10) as Asuka
 Montage (2016, Fuji TV) as Miku Odagiri
 Beppin San (2016–17, NHK) as Sumire Bando
 Chiisana Kyojin (2017, TBS) as Yuri Mishima
 Innocent Days (2018, Wowow)
 Princess Jellyfish (2018, Fuji TV) as Tsukimi Kurashita
 Stay Tuned! (2019, HTB) as Hanako Yukimaru
 Two Weeks (2019, Fuji TV) as Kaede Tsukishima
 The Kotaki brothers' 12 Sufferings (2020, TV Tokyo) as Satsuki Sasaya
 Akiko's Pianos (2020, NHK BS Premium/BS4K) as Akiko Kawamoto
 I Had a Dream of That Girl (2020, TV Tokyo) as herself
 Life's Punchline (2021, NTV) as Natsumi Kishikura
 Hankei 5 Metoru (2021, NHK) as Fumika Maeda
 Guilty Flag (2021–22, NTV) as Mizuho Ninomiya
 Is My KAWAII About To Expire? (2022, TV Asahi) as Izumi Sanada
 OLD ROOKIE (2022, TBS) as Touko Fukasawa

Japanese dub 
 The Boss Baby (2018, DreamWorks Animation) as Tim Leslie Templeton
 The Boss Baby: Family Business (2021, DreamWorks Animation) as Tabitha Templeton

Awards

References

External links
  
 
 
 

1997 births
Living people
Actresses from Tokyo
Japanese television actresses
Japanese film actresses
Asadora lead actors
21st-century Japanese actresses